In the ticketing system of the British rail network, tickets are normally issued to and from individual stations.  In some instances, when there is more than one station in a town or other locality—especially where these are on different routes—it may be desirable for passengers to be able to travel to one station and back from another, or more generally to be able to choose which of the stations they wish to travel to.  To accommodate this requirement, British Rail introduced a series of station groups: notional "common locations" to which tickets from stations outside that group would be issued.

For example, Penge in South London has two stations: Penge East and Penge West.  The former is served by trains from London Victoria to Orpington; the latter is on the route from London Bridge to West Croydon.  For a traveller arriving at, for example, a London terminal station and intending to go to Penge, it makes little difference which route is chosen.  Both stations are close together and serve the same area.  Therefore, a ticket issued specifically to one of the Penge stations would be unduly restrictive—it would remove the opportunity to travel by a choice of equally convenient routes.  A notional "Penge group" solves this problem: a ticket issued in this way would be interavailable.

The concept is explained in the National Fares Manuals (NFMs) issued approximately three times per year by the British Railways Board (and, since privatisation, by the Association of Train Operating Companies) to stations, Rail Appointed Travel Agents and other ticket issuing authorities: "Fares for certain ... cities and towns are shown to and from a notional common station[.]  All fares are quoted and all tickets should be issued to and from [these notional group] stations except for local journeys between two stations in the same group.  Tickets issued to and from these [notional group] stations are valid to or from any of their associated stations, subject to normal route availability."

Terminology and appearance on tickets

These "locations" had to be shown in a standard, easily identifiable way on tickets.  The method chosen by the British Railways Board was as follows:
 Take the name of the actual location where the stations are: for Penge East and Penge West, PENGE.
 Add the suffix BR to this: PENGE BR.

Each station group was also allocated its own National Location Code (NLC)—a four-digit code used for accounting and to attribute revenue to locations on the railway network.  Most station group codes were between 0250 and 0500.  This NLC appeared on PORTIS/SPORTIS tickets, which by convention always showed the "origin" and "destination" NLCs as well as the code of the issuing point; but tickets from the APTIS system and its replacements always showed the NLC of the actual station of issue, even where a ticket was issued from a "station group" (except for some short-lived anomalies).

After privatisation, the designation "BR" was no longer appropriate, although having been in use for more than 10 years it had become a convenient shorthand device for referring to the station groups concept in general (for example, National Fares Manuals continued to use the term "BR Stations").  A new designation had to be created which still took up little space on a ticket (location names are restricted to 16 characters on most ticket issuing systems) and which still conveyed a notion of interavailability.

The solution, introduced gradually from November 1997 and uploaded to all ticket issuing systems by January 1998, was for BR to be changed to STNS or STATIONS as appropriate:
 STNS if the location name was between 8 and 11 characters in length: for example, LIVERPOOL BR became LIVERPOOL STNS.
 STATIONS if the location name was 7 characters or fewer: for example, DORKING BR became DORKING STATIONS.

There were some deviations from this standard:
 As GAINSBOROUGH is 12 characters in length, a meaningful abbreviation to signify the station grouping could not be created. As a result the Gainsborough group is simply shown as GAINSBOROUGH.
 As GLASGOW STATIONS could have been mistakenly interpreted by passengers as referring to the whole of the Glasgow suburban rail network, it was used only briefly before being changed in mid-April 1998 to GLASGOW CEN/QST, specifically representing Glasgow Central and Glasgow Queen Street stations.

Additionally, the London group is treated as a special case. It was created in April 1970 by BR's Southern Region as a grouping of their nine terminal stations named LONDON S.R., before being expanded in May 1983 to include all BR terminals under the name LONDON BR, and then LONDON BRIT RAIL from January 1989 until 1997. Rather than receiving the standard new name of LONDON STATIONS it was referred to simply as LONDON before becoming LONDON TERMINALS in April 1998, even though four of the eighteen stations included in the group are not technically termini.

Existing groups
, 38 station groups (including the London group) are known to exist. The table shows the NLC allocated to each group, the pre- and post-privatisation renderings of the group name, and the stations included within it.

Defunct groups
The following table contains groups which have been used at some time between 1985 and the present, but which are not currently in use.

The London group

The status of individual stations within groups
The station group concept only applied to point-to-point travel tickets and tickets directly related to these, such as Season Tickets and Excess Tickets.  Other types of ticket issued at a station within a group would show the name of the station itself - selected examples are:
 One Day Travelcards in the London area
 Platform Tickets
 Car Park Tickets
 Rail Rovers and Rangers

Also, for a ticket issued for travel between one station in a group and another, the individual stations' names are shown.  This only has practical relevance in situations where group stations are easily accessible from each other - for example, the Liverpool group, where all four stations can be reached directly from each of the others.

In other countries 
Station groupings are also used on transport networks in other countries, though not necessarily to the same extent as in the UK.

Australia 
Tickets issued by Victorian regional train and coach operator V/Line for travel to Melbourne city are issued to the group MELBOURNE Z1/2, indicating Myki Zones 1 and 2, and therefore including all stations on the Melbourne suburban rail network as well as all bus and tram services within those zones.

Germany 
Rail tickets in Germany for travel distances over  can be issued to station groups, which are referred to as Abgang-/Zielbahnhöfe mit tariflicher Gleichstellung (effectively destination stations with equal fares). For example, the BERLIN group includes all main-line and S-Bahn stations on and within the Berlin Ringbahn.

References

Fare collection systems in the United Kingdom